HMS Betony was a  of the British Royal Navy. She was ordered in 1941, and commissioned in August 1945. She was immediately transferred to the Royal Indian Navy, where she was commissioned as HMIS Sind. She was transferred back to the Royal Navy in May 1946, as the war ended just days after her transfer. She was then sold to the Royal Thai Navy in 1947 as HTMS Prasae, and eventually scuttled in 1951.

History
Betony was ordered from Alexander Hall and Sons for the Royal Navy in 1941.

She was transferred to the Royal Indian Navy and the Eastern Fleet immediately upon commissioning in August 1945 and served as HMIS Sind. She developed engine trouble soon after her transfer. With the end of World War II just days after her transfer and the imminent independence of India, she was transferred back to the Royal Navy in 1946.

In 1947, she was sold to the Royal Thai Navy and commissioned as HTMS Prasae. On 7 January 1951, while serving in the Korean War during a snowstorm, she was beached near Yangyang on the east coast of North Korea. After unsuccessful attempts to pull her off the beach, she was scuttled.

See also
Thailand in the Korean War

References

 

Flower-class corvettes of the Royal Indian Navy
1943 ships
Maritime incidents in 1951